Zahid Hussain (born 6 March 1972) is a British fiction writer and poet of Kashmiri and Pashtun origin.<ref name=chambers> Photograph and first four pages available on Google boks</ref> His debut novel, The Curry Mile'', was published by Suitcase Press, a Manchester-based publishing house. Hussain explores social and ethical issues in his writing.

Hussain was born in Darwen, Lancashire and grew up in Blackburn speaking Urdu, Punjabi, and English. He has a European IT degree from Sheffield Hallam University and postgraduate management qualifications from the universities of Bournemouth, Barcelona and Bordeaux.

Since 2021 Hussain has been a councillor on Manchester City Council, representing the Levenshulme ward for the Labour Party. He is chair of the trustees of Manchester City of Literature.

Hussain is a winner of the North West Poetry Slam.

Selected publications

References

Further reading

External links

1972 births
Living people
British male novelists
British male poets
British writers of Pakistani descent
21st-century British novelists
21st-century British male writers